Jobst Hirscht (born 19 July 1948) is a German former athlete who competed mainly in the 100 metres.

Born in Schleswig, he competed for West Germany in the 1972 Summer Olympics held in Munich, Germany in the 4 x 100 metre relay where he won the bronze medal with his team mates Karlheinz Klotz, Gerhard Wucherer and Klaus Ehl.

References

Sports Reference

1948 births
Living people
People from Schleswig, Schleswig-Holstein
Sportspeople from Schleswig-Holstein
West German male sprinters
Olympic bronze medalists for West Germany
Athletes (track and field) at the 1972 Summer Olympics
Olympic athletes of West Germany
Medalists at the 1972 Summer Olympics
Olympic bronze medalists in athletics (track and field)